Baron Broughshane, of Kensington in the County of London, was a title in the Peerage of the United Kingdom. It was created on 19 September 1945 for William Davison, who had earlier represented Kensington South in the House of Commons as a Conservative. The title became extinct on the death of his younger son, the third Baron (who had succeeded his elder brother in 1995), on 24 March 2006.

Barons Broughshane (1945)
William Henry Davison, 1st Baron Broughshane (1872–1953)
Patrick Owen Alexander Davison, 2nd Baron Broughshane (1903–1995)
(William) Kensington Davison, 3rd Baron Broughshane (1914–2006)

References

Kidd, Charles, Williamson, David (editors). Debrett's Peerage and Baronetage (1990 edition). New York: St Martin's Press, 1990.

Extinct baronies in the Peerage of the United Kingdom
Noble titles created in 1945
Noble titles created for UK MPs